Ntamugenga is a location in North Kivu, Democratic Republic of the Congo. As of July 2012 it is under the control of the March 23 Movement.

References

Populated places in North Kivu